Sarah Moore may refer to:

 Sarah Moore (journalist), British television reporter, presenter and academic
 Sarah Moore (The Family) (1969–2016), Australian writer who spent her childhood in The Family, a new religious movement
 Sarah Moore (racing driver) (born 1993), English racing driver
 Sarah Wool Moore (1846–1911), artist and art teacher

See also 
 Sara Jane Moore (born 1930), American citizen who attempted to assassinate US President Gerald Ford